Artsyz (Artsiz; ;  or Arsız;  or Arzis) is a city and the administrative center of Artsyz municipality, Bolhrad Raion in Odesa Oblast, Ukraine. Population:  In 2001, population was 16,370.

History

The city was founded in 1816 by German colonists from Swabia and the just dissolved Duchy of Warsaw and was named after the Battle of Arcis-sur-Aube.

Artsyz was bombed on 3 May 2022 by Russian forces during the Russian invasion of Ukraine.

References

Cities in Odesa Oblast
Cities of district significance in Ukraine
Former German settlements in Odesa Oblast
1816 establishments in the Russian Empire
Populated places established in the Russian Empire
Akkermansky Uyezd
Cetatea Albă County
Bolhrad Raion
1816 in Ukraine